Jonas Smulders (born 1994, Amsterdam) is a Dutch actor. He made ihs acting debut at 16. In 2015, he won a Golden Calf for his role in the short Geen koningen in ons bloed from the film series One Night Stand. He was named one of the "Shooting Stars" at the Berlin Film Festival in 2018.

Filmography

Film 
 2021 – Forever Rich
 2020 – De Oost
 2018 – Niemand in de stad
 2017 – Silk Road
 2017 – Broers
 2015 – Geen Koningen in ons Bloed
 2016 – Brasserie Valentijn
 2015 – Een Goed Leven
 2015 – Ventoux
 2014 – Jongens
 2014 – Ketamine 
 2013 – Het Diner

Television 

 2020 – Hollands Hoop, season 3
 2019 – De TV Kantine as Frenkie de Jong
 2017 – Hollands Hoop, season 2
 2016 – Zenith 2015 – 4JIM 2015 – Familie Kruys, season 2
 2015 – A'dam & E.V.A, season 3
 2015 – Noord/Zuid 2014 – Familie Kruys, season 1
 2014 – Flikken Maastricht 2013 – Penoza, season 3
 2011 – Hoe overleef ik''

References

Living people
1994 births
21st-century Dutch male actors
Male actors from Amsterdam
Golden Calf winners